The Eat 'Em and Smile Tour was a North American concert tour by David Lee Roth.  It was his first tour since leaving Van Halen in 1985, and is the only tour to have featured the line-up of session musicians that appeared on Eat 'Em Smile: Steve Vai, Billy Sheehan, and Gregg Bissonette (joined by keyboardist Brett Tuggle).

Overview
With the success of the Eat 'Em and Smile album in North America, Roth embarked upon an extensive tour. The setlist was almost evenly split between Van Halen songs ("Unchained", "Panama", "Jump") and Roth solo hits ("California Girls", "Yankee Rose", "Goin' Crazy").

As with past Van Halen tours, Roth once again incorporated a concert trademark in which he sang a song ("Ain't Talkin' 'Bout Love") from a mini-stage in the middle of the venue at each performance, while the rest of the band continued to perform on the main stage. Another concert highlight was an extended guitar and bass solo "battle" (often lasting over ten minutes), which saw Vai and Sheehan try to top each other on their respective instrument. No professionally filmed or recorded video or audio footage has ever been released from this tour, but its massive stage set can be seen in the performance section of the "Yankee Rose" video. The opening acts on this tour included Cinderella and Tesla at various points.

A video shoot took place on February 17, 1987 in Lakeland, Florida.

Setlist
 "Shy Boy" (Talas) 
 "Tobacco Road" (John D. Loudermilk)
 "Unchained" (Van Halen) 
 "Panama" (Van Halen)
 Drum solo (Gregg Bissonette)
 "Oh, Pretty Woman" (Roy Orbison)
 "Ladies' Nite in Buffalo?"
 "Everybody Wants Some!!" (Van Halen)
 "On Fire" (Van Halen)
 "Bump and Grind"
 "Ice Cream Man" (John Brim)
 "Big Trouble" 
 "Yankee Rose"
 Bass/Guitar solos (Billy Sheehan/Steve Vai)
 "Ain't Talkin' 'bout Love" (Van Halen)
 "Goin' Crazy!"
 "Jump" (Van Halen)
 "California Girls" (The Beach Boys)

Tour dates

References

David Lee Roth
Concert tours of the United States
Concert tours of Canada
1987 concert tours
1986 concert tours